Sons of Liberty is a 1939 American short drama film directed by Michael Curtiz, which tells the story of Haym Solomon. At the 12th Academy Awards, held in 1940, it won an Academy Award for Best Short Subject (Two-Reel).

Cast
 Claude Rains as Haym Salomon
 Gale Sondergaard as Rachel Salomon
 Donald Crisp as Alexander McDougall
 Montagu Love as George Washington
 Henry O'Neill as Member of Continental Congress
 James Stephenson as Colonel Tillman
 Harry Cording as Arresting Trooper (uncredited) 
 Jack Mower as Messenger (uncredited) 
 Moroni Olsen as Robert Morris (uncredited) 
 Larry Williams as Nathan Hale (uncredited)

See also
 Sons of Liberty
 American Revolution
 American War of Independence
 List of films about the American Revolution
 List of television series and miniseries about the American Revolution

References

External links

1939 films
1939 short films
1930s war drama films
1939 drama films
American war drama films
American Revolutionary War films
American black-and-white films
Cultural depictions of George Washington
Films directed by Michael Curtiz
American films based on actual events
Films set in the 1770s
Live Action Short Film Academy Award winners
Warner Bros. short films
1930s English-language films
1930s American films